Collège Français is a private French-language secondary school in Longueuil, Quebec, Canada.

It was established in 1987. It followed a Collège Français primary school that opened in Longueuil in 1972, and a campus of the Collège Français secondary school in Montreal which opened in 1959.

Collège Français is home to the Longueuil Collège Français Quebec Junior AAA Hockey League team.

References

External links
 Collège Français Official Website 

High schools in Longueuil
Private schools in Quebec
Educational institutions established in 1987
1987 establishments in Quebec